Lily van der Stokker (born 1954) is a Dutch visual artist. She is known for her colorful site-specific painted installations incorporating words and decorative motifs that reference social realities and power dynamics.

Biography
Lily van der Stokker was born in Den Bosch, Netherlands, and lives in New York City and Amsterdam. She received a degree from the Academy of Art and Design St. Joost in Breda in monumental design and painting, where she studied from 1975 to 1979, and a degree from the R.K. Scholengemeenschap St. Dionysus in Tilburg in drawing and textiles.

Exhibitions
Lily van der Stokker has exhibited her work widely including one-person shows at the Stedelijk Museum, Amsterdam (2018); Museum Ludwig, Cologne, Germany (2003); Galerie Air de Paris, Paris (2014, 2005, 2000); Tate Museum St. Ives, Cornwall, England (2012); Van Abbemuseum, Eindhoven, Netherlands (2005–7), among others. She was commissioned by the Hammer Museum in Los Angeles to create an installation. Her large-scale installation, "Huh" was exhibited at Koenig and Clinton Gallery, New York in 2014.

Public art works

Van der Stokker has created several monumental public art works including the Pink Building for the World Expo, Hannover, Germany (2000), and Celestial Teapot, at the Hoog Catharijne in Utrecht (2013).

Collections
Her work is in the collection of the Stedelijk Museum, Amsterdam. Twelve of her works are in the collection of the Museum of Contemporary Art Van Abbemuseum, Eindhoven.

References 

1954 births
Living people
20th-century Dutch women artists
21st-century Dutch women artists
Dutch contemporary artists
Dutch installation artists
Women installation artists